Jack Hall Alliger Lee Fairweather (1878–1948) was a lawyer and political figure in New Brunswick, Canada. He represented King's County in the Legislative Assembly of New Brunswick from 1930 to 1935 as a Conservative member.

He was born in Rothesay or Saint John, New Brunswick, the son of Authur C. Fairweather, a New Brunswick lawyer, and Annie R. Lee. He was educated at Rothesay Collegiate School, the University of New Brunswick and Harvard Law School. Fairweather entered practice in Saint John. He married Agnes Clifton Tabor and then married Agnes Charlotte Mackeen after his first wife's death. He served in the Royal Canadian Artillery during World War I. He was defeated in a bid for reelection to the provincial assembly in 1935. Later that year, he was named to the Supreme Court of New Brunswick and served until his death.

His son Gordon served in the provincial assembly and the Canadian House of Commons.

References 
 Thumbnail Sketches: Rothesay Past and Present, Rothesay Living Museum

1878 births
1948 deaths
Harvard Law School alumni
Judges in New Brunswick
Canadian Anglicans
Progressive Conservative Party of New Brunswick MLAs